Jack Sambrook (born 10 March 1899, date of death unknown) was an English footballer who played as a striker.

External links
 LFC History profile

1899 births
Year of death missing
English footballers
Liverpool F.C. players
Association football forwards